The Keswick Bridge carries the Anzac Highway over the Adelaide-Wolseley railway line in Adelaide, Australia.

History
The Anzac Highway crossed over the Adelaide-Wolseley railway line via a flat junction to the south of Keswick railway station. In 1911, the South Australian Railways built a bridge over the line, that was widened in 1927.

A new bridge built by Baulderstone was officially opened by Premier Don Dunstan on 27 October 1967.

References

Bridges completed in 1967
Buildings and structures in Adelaide
Road bridges in South Australia
1967 establishments in Australia